is a Japanese astronomer, staff member at the Gekko Observatory and discoverer of asteroids. He is credited by the Minor Planet Center with the discovery of 115 minor planets between 1997 and 2000.

The outer main-belt asteroid 6665 Kagawa was named in his honor on 6 January 2003.

List of discovered minor planets

References

External links 
 Article of the Yamamoto Circular mentioning Kagawa.

Discoverers of asteroids

20th-century Japanese astronomers
Living people
1969 births